Ron Miller (born August 19, 1939) is a former quarterback in the National Football League (NFL). Miller was drafted in the third round of the 1961 NFL Draft by the Los Angeles Rams and later played with the team during the 1962 NFL season. He was also drafted in the twenty-first round of the 1961 American Football League Draft by the Houston Oilers.

See also
 List of college football yearly passing leaders

References

Sportspeople from Cook County, Illinois
Los Angeles Rams players
American football quarterbacks
Wisconsin Badgers football players
1939 births
Living people